Edwin Pellot (born 13 June 1963) is a Puerto Rican basketball player. He competed in the men's tournament at the 1992 Summer Olympics.

References

External links
 

1963 births
Living people
Puerto Rican men's basketball players
Olympic basketball players of Puerto Rico
Basketball players at the 1992 Summer Olympics
Place of birth missing (living people)
20th-century Puerto Rican people